Alameda is an unincorporated community in Bernalillo County, New Mexico.

Notable person
Arthur Tafoya (1933–2018), Roman Catholic bishop

Notes

Unincorporated communities in Bernalillo County, New Mexico
Unincorporated communities in New Mexico